The Conway base 13 function is a function created by British mathematician John H. Conway as a counterexample to the converse of the intermediate value theorem. In other words, it is a function that satisfies a particular intermediate-value property—on any interval (a, b), the function f takes every value between f(a) and f(b)—but is not continuous.

Purpose

The Conway base 13 function was created as part of a "produce" activity: in this case, the challenge was to produce a simple-to-understand function which takes on every real value in every interval, that is, it is an everywhere surjective function.  It is thus discontinuous at every point.

Sketch of definition

 Every real number x can be represented in base 13 in a unique canonical way; such representations use the digits 0–9 plus three additional symbols, say {A, B, C}.  For example, the number 54349589 has a base-13 representation B34C128.
 If instead of {A, B, C}, we judiciously choose the symbols {+, −, .}, something interesting happens: some numbers in base 13 will have representations that look like well-formed decimals in base 10: for example, the number 54349589 has a base-13 representation of −34.128. Of course, most numbers will not be intelligible in this way; for example, the number 3629265 has the base-13 representation 9+0−−7.
 Conway's base-13 function takes in a real number x and considers its base-13 representation as a sequence of symbols .  If from some position onward,  the representation looks like a well-formed decimal number r, then f(x) = r. Otherwise, f(x) = 0.  (Well-formed means that it starts with a + or − symbol, contains exactly one decimal-point symbol, and otherwise contains only the digits 0–9).  For example, if a number x has the representation 8++2.19+0−−7+3.141592653..., then f(x) = +3.141592653....

Definition

The Conway base-13 function is a function  defined as follows. Write the argument  value as a tridecimal (a "decimal" in base 13) using 13 symbols as "digits": ; there should be no trailing C recurring.  There may be a leading sign, and somewhere there will be a tridecimal point to separate the integer part from the fractional part; these should both be ignored in the sequel.  These "digits" can be thought of as having the values 0 to 12 respectively; Conway originally used the digits "+", "−" and "." instead of A, B, C, and underlined all of the base-13 "digits" to clearly distinguish them from the usual base-10 digits and symbols.
 Similarly, if the tridecimal expansion of  ends with  then 
 Otherwise, 

For example:

Properties

 In fact, the Conway base-13 function satisfies a much stronger intermediate-value property—on every interval (a, b), the function  passes through every real number. As a result, it satisfies a much stronger discontinuity property— it is discontinuous everywhere.
 To prove that the Conway base-13 function satisfies this stronger intermediate property, let (a, b) be an interval, let c be a point in that interval, and let r be any real number. Create a base-13 encoding of r as follows: starting with the base-10 representation of r, replace the decimal point with C and indicate the sign of r by prepending either an A (if r is positive) or a B (if r is negative) to the beginning.  By definition of the Conway base-13 function, the resulting string  has the property that  Moreover, any base-13 string that ends in  will have this property. Thus, if we replace the tail end of c with  the resulting number will have f(c) = r. By introducing this modification sufficiently far along the tridecimal representation of  you can ensure that the new number  will still lie in the interval  This proves that for any number r, in every interval we can find a point  such that 
 The Conway base-13 function is therefore discontinuous everywhere: a real function that is continuous at x must be locally bounded at x, i.e. it must be bounded on some interval around x. But as shown above, the Conway base-13 function is unbounded on every interval around every point; therefore it is not continuous anywhere.

See also

References

 

Functions and mappings
John Horton Conway
Special functions